Georgios Moustopoulos (born 24 April 1971) is a Greek wrestler. He competed in the men's freestyle 62 kg at the 1992 Summer Olympics.

References

1971 births
Living people
Greek male sport wrestlers
Olympic wrestlers of Greece
Wrestlers at the 1992 Summer Olympics
Place of birth missing (living people)
Soviet people of Greek descent